

The 1st Cavalry Army was a prominent Red Army military formation. It was also known as "Budyonny's Cavalry Army" or simply as Konarmia (Кона́рмия, "Horsearmy").

History 
When the Russian Civil War broke out in 1918, a non-commissioned officer named Budyonny organized a small cavalry force in the Don region out of local Cossacks. This force rapidly grew in numbers, sided with the Bolsheviks and eventually became the 1st Cavalry Army. It was transformed from a guerrilla force into a proper military unit under the command of Semyon Budyonny, and the political guidance of Kliment Voroshilov, and at a crucial time too with the red army not doing particularly well in the southern front due to a lack of cavalry.

This army played an important role in winning the Civil War for the Bolsheviks, driving the White General Anton Denikin back from his advance towards Moscow.

In 1920 Budyonny's Cavalry Army took part in the defence from Poland during the Polish-Bolshevik War, at first with remarkable success. The 1st Cavalry Army pushed Polish forces out of Ukraine and broke through Polish southern frontlines, but later was bogged down at Lvov. This in turn led to a heavy defeat of the rest of the Bolshevik forces in the Battle of Warsaw. When Budyonny's Cavalry finally joined the battle it was also soundly defeated in the Battle of Komarów, known as the last great cavalry battle in history. At this point, the 1st Cavalry Army's morale and discipline were at a low point, and robbery and violence against the civilian population became commonplace.  The 1st Cavalry Army also became known for periodic outbreaks of murderous anti-semitism.

The remains of the 1st Cavalry Army were sent south to fight Wrangel's White forces in Ukraine and the Crimea. In May 1921 the 1st Cavalry Army was moved to North Caucasus. This movement was the basis of myth about the invincible 1st Cavalry Army, which was cultivated by Soviet propaganda. On 4 May, its field headquarters was used to form the headquarters of the North Caucasus Military District (2nd formation). However, troops remained subordinated to the army staff until its dissolution on 11 October 1923. 

The march of the 1st Cavalry Army became popular after the Russian Civil War and was celebrated in a song, We are the Red Cavalry. Other titles of the song were "Мы красные кавалеристы" (We, Red cavalrymen) and "[Марш Буденного]" (Budenny march), and "Марш красных конников" (March of the Red horsemen).

In commemoration, a monument to the 1st Cavalry Army was built in Lvov oblast, Ukraine.

Notable figures in the 1st Cavalry Army
Semyon Budyonny
Kliment Voroshilov
Georgy Zhukov, Soviet military commander, famous for his role in World War II.
Grigory Kulik, Soviet military commander
Kirill Meretskov, Soviet military commander
Semyon Timoshenko, Soviet military commander
Andrei Grechko, Soviet military commander
Efim Shchadenko, Soviet military commander 
Andrei Bubnov, Soviet military commander 
Semyon Krivoshein, Soviet military commander
Isaac Babel, journalist and writer, who wrote the 1920 Diary and the book Red Cavalry based on his experiences
Vadim Yakovlev, yesaul
Grigori Maslakov, Soviet military commander, who later defected to the Makhnovists

References

Sources 
 
 Д. Ознобишин. К истории Первой Конной Армии // журнал "Вопросы истории", № 12, декабрь 1949. стр.109-126

External links
Bibliography of the Polish-Soviet War The City University of New York

Military units and formations established in 1918
1918 establishments in Russia
Soviet Cavalry Armies